The Kentucky Transportation Center (or KTC) is a university transportation research center within the University of Kentucky College of Engineering. Founded in 1941 as the Division of Research of the Kentucky Department of Highways, KTC became part of the University in 1981.  

KTC is a hub of applied multidisciplinary transportation research. KTC has built a strong partnership with the Kentucky Transportation Cabinet, and also works with other clients and transportation agencies across the United States.

KTC has 14 program areas including:

 Bridge Preservation
 Business Office
 Construction Engineering & Project Development
 Education Planning & Decision Analytics
 Intelligent Transportation Systems
 Marketing, Media, & Technical Review
 Occupational Safety & Health
 Pavements, Materials, Geotechnology, & Infrastructure Assessment
 Policy, Finance, & Economics
 Project Development
 Special Projects & Initiatives
 Structures
 Technology Transfer
 Traffic & Safety
 

KTC is housed on the University of Kentucky campus with their main office located in the Oliver H. Raymond building. KTC shares this space with and enjoys a strong relationship with the Department of Civil Engineering at UK.

External links
 Official site
 UKnowledge - Repository of Research Reports

References

 https://ktc.uky.edu/
 
 
 
 https://www.kyt2.com/
 
 https://twitter.com/kytransport 
 https://www.linkedin.com/company/ktc-uky
 
 
 
 


University of Kentucky